Loricaria is a genus of armored catfish native to South America.

Taxonomy
Loricaria was the first genus of the family Loricariidae described. Thus, it is the nominal genus of the family Loricariidae. Phylogenetic relationships within Loricaria and among other members of Loricariini remain uncertain. Its external morphology shows few shared derived characters, making comparison with other genera difficult. Loricaria has been hypothesized to occupy a basal position among members of the subtribe Loricariina, with the other genera possessing
derived characters. Based on the characteristics of its mouth, Loricaria appears to maintain a close relationship with representatives of the Pseudohemiodon group. Proloricaria is considered a synonym of Loricaria.

Species
These are the currently recognized species in this genus:
 Loricaria apeltogaster Boulenger, 1895
 Loricaria birindellii M. R. Thomas & Sabaj Pérez, 2010
 Loricaria cataphracta Linnaeus, 1758
 Loricaria clavipinna Fowler, 1940
 Loricaria coximensis M. S. Rodriguez, Cavallaro & M. R. Thomas, 2012
 Loricaria cuffyi Alejandro Londoño-Burbano, Alexander Urbano-Bonilla & Matthew R. Thomas, 2020
 Loricaria holmbergi M. S. Rodriguez & Miquelarena, 2005
 Loricaria lata C. H. Eigenmann & R. S. Eigenmann, 1889
 Loricaria lentiginosa Isbrücker, 1979
 Loricaria luciae M. R. Thomas, M. S. Rodriguez, Cavallaro, Froehlich & R. M. C. Castro, 2013 
 Loricaria lundbergi M. R. Thomas & Rapp Py-Daniel, 2008
 Loricaria nickeriensis Isbrücker, 1979
 Loricaria parnahybae Steindachner, 1907
 Loricaria piracicabae R. Ihering (pt), 1907
 Loricaria pumila M. R. Thomas & Rapp Py-Daniel, 2008
 Loricaria simillima Regan, 1904
 Loricaria spinulifera M. R. Thomas & Rapp Py-Daniel, 2008
 Loricaria tucumanensis Isbrücker, 1979

Distribution and habitat
This genus is distributed east of the Andes in nearly the entire tropical and subtropical parts of South America. Species occur in a variety of habitats from the main flow of rivers on sandy and rocky bottoms to flooded areas and lakes over muddy and sandy bottoms.

Description
Loricaria species are recognized by the presence of elongate, slender filaments on the lips and a low number of bicuspid premaxillary teeth (usually three to four per side) that are about twice the length of the dentary teeth.

Sexual dimorphism includes hypertrophied development of the pectoral fin spines, blunt odontodes on the pelvic and anal fin spines, and tooth crowns becoming shortened and rounded in mature males.

For the four species characterized, karyotypic diversity ranges from 2n = 62 to 2n = 68.

Ecology
The site of egg deposition varies between different members of the genus. In some species, eggs are carried on the enlarged lower lip of the male. L. piracicabae has its egg adherent to its ventral surface. Males are abdomino-lip brooders.

References

Loricariini
Fish of South America
Catfish genera
Taxa named by Carl Linnaeus
Freshwater fish genera